Call Me Mister is a British television drama series, created by Robert Banks Stewart who had previously developed Shoestring and Bergerac for the BBC. One series of ten episodes was broadcast between September and November 1986.

The series starred Steve Bisley as Jack Bartholomew, an Australian former police officer who returns to England after his father dies, having inherited his substantial estate. Uncomfortable with his new found status, Bartholomew prefers to use his police skills working as a private detective.

Cast

Steve Bisley as Jack Bartholomew
David Bamber as Fred Hurley
Dulice Liecier as Julie Columbus
Dermot Crowley as Det. Sgt. McBride
Haydn Gwynne as Bridget Bartholomew
Rupert Frazer as Philip Bartholomew

Episodes

References

External links
 

BBC television dramas
1980s British drama television series
1986 British television series debuts
1986 British television series endings
1980s British television miniseries
British detective television series
English-language television shows